Wouter Scheelen (born 16 October 1985) is a Belgian football player currently playing for Bocholt in the Belgian Second Amateur Division.

References
Guardian Football

Belgian footballers
1985 births
Living people
K.V.C. Westerlo players
Lommel S.K. players
Oud-Heverlee Leuven players
Fortuna Sittard players
Belgian Pro League players
Eerste Divisie players
Belgian expatriate footballers
Belgian expatriate sportspeople in the Netherlands
Expatriate footballers in the Netherlands
Sportspeople from Hasselt
Footballers from Limburg (Belgium)
Association football midfielders